Charmois is a commune in the Territoire de Belfort department in Bourgogne-Franche-Comté in northeastern France.

The inhabitants of the town of Charmois are called Charmoyens, Charmoyennes in French.

Population

See also

Communes of the Territoire de Belfort department

References

Communes of the Territoire de Belfort